Team Pelfrey is an American racing team in the F1600 Championship Series and F2000 Championship Series. The team is owned by Dale Pelfrey.

Indy Racing League (1998–2000)
John Paul Jr. replaced Danny Ongais as driver for the 1998 Indianapolis 500 due to Ongais crashing and suffering a concussion. Paul Jr. finished seventh and led the race. Robby Unser drove for Pelfrey in 1999. Lyn St. James failed to qualify for the 1999 Indianapolis 500 due to rain on the final qualifying day and a backup car accident. The team was put up for auction on eBay in June 1999. The high bid was $1,500,300 and did not meet the reserve of $3 million. Sarah Fisher raced for the team at Texas Motor Speedway in 1999. Billy Boat drove for Pelfrey after being unable to fund his own team for the 2000 Indy Racing League season. Boat wrecked his Pelfrey primary car for the 2000 Indianapolis 500, but would qualify driving for A. J. Foyt Enterprises.

Road to Indy (2011–present)

USF2000 and Pro Mazda
The team returned to racing in the 2011 Star Mazda Championship with driver Nick Andries. Jack Hawksworth won the 2012 Star Mazda Championship. Pelfrey would join the U.S. F2000 National Championship in 2015. Santiago Urrutia won the 2015 Pro Mazda Championship. Both series teams underwent a leadership change in May 2016, with Dale Pelfrey taking over operations from Nigel Tuckey. Aaron Telitz won the 2016 Pro Mazda Championship over teammate Patricio O'Ward. Team Pelfrey's USF2000 and Pro Mazda teams moved from Pompano Beach, Florida to Indianapolis, Indiana in late 2016. The team was located at TKM Inc. under Thomas Knapp. Pelfrey shut down its USF2000 after the 2018 season.

Indy Lights

2016
Team Pelfrey purchased 8 Star Motorsports and entered two cars in the 2016 Indy Lights series. Felix Rosenqvist tested with the team at Palm Beach International Raceway, but would later sign with Belardi Auto Racing. Juan Piedrahita became the team's full-time driver, with Scott Hargrove running several races. Garett Grist moved up from Pro Mazda for the road course races starting at Road America, replacing Hargrove. Piedrahita left the team after Toronto and Sean Rayhall joined for Mazda Raceway Laguna Seca.

2017
Juan Piedrahita rejoined Team Pelfrey for the 2017 Indy Lights season. Patricio O'Ward joined the team for St. Petersburg and finished third  in race two. Piedrahita won the pole at Gateway and finished 2nd.

2018
Neil Alberico and Shelby Blackstock joined the team for St. Petersburg. Davey Hamilton Jr. joined for the Freedom 100. The team moved its operations from Florida to Indianapolis before the 2019 season.

2019
Toby Sowery joined the team for St. Petersburg. Sowery won for HMD Motorsports/Team Pelfrey at the Sunday Portland race.

Driver history

Indy Racing League
 Billy Boat (2000)
 Tyce Carlson (1998)
 Memo Gidley (2000)
 Lyn St. James (1998–1999)
 Sarah Fisher (1999)
 Danny Ongais (1998)
 John Paul Jr. (1998)
 Robby Unser (1999)

Road to Indy

Indy Lights (2016–present)
 Garett Grist (2016)
 Scott Hargrove (2016)
 Patricio O'Ward (2017)
 Juan Piedrahita (2016)
 Sean Rayhall (2016)
 Davey Hamilton Jr. (2018)
 Shelby Blackstock (2018)

Pro Mazda Championship (2011–present)
 Jack Aitken (2014)
 Nick Andries (2011)
 Nicolas Costa (2013–2014)
 Carlos Cunha Filho (2017–present)
 Connor De Phillippi (2011)
 Pipo Derani (2014)
 TJ Fischer (2016–present)
 Jack Hawksworth (2012 series champion)
 Dalton Kellett (2013–2014)
 Anders Krohn (2013–2014)
 Nikita Lastochkin (2017–present)
 Gustavo Menezes (2012)
 Brandon Newey (2014)
 Patricio O'Ward (2015–2016)
 Raoul Owens (2015)
 Spencer Pigot (2013)
 Stefan Rzadzinski (2013)
 Petri Suvanto (2012–2013)
 Weiron Tan (2016)
 Aaron Telitz (2016 series champion)
 Ryan Tveter (2012)
 Santiago Urrutia (2015 series champion)

U.S. F2000 National Championship (2015–present)
 Ayla Ågren (2015, 2017–present)
 Jordan Cane (2016)
 Phillippe Denes (2016–present)
 Kaylen Frederick (2016–present)
 Luke Gabin (2015)
 Nikita Lastochkin (2015)
 Jacob Loomis (2017–present)
 Robert Megennis (2016-present)
 James Munro (2016)
 Garth Rickards (2015)

Complete racing results

Indy Racing League
(key)

 The 1999 VisionAire 500K at Charlotte was cancelled after 79 laps due to spectator fatalities.

Indy Lights
(key)

Star Mazda/Pro Mazda Championship
key)

U.S. F2000 National Championship
key)

F1600 Championship Series

F2000 Championship Series

References

External links
 

Indy Lights teams
American auto racing teams
IndyCar Series teams